The 1878 City of Dunedin by-election was a by-election held  on 1 July 1878 in the  electorate in Dunedin during the 6th New Zealand Parliament. At the time the electorate had three members.

The by-election was caused by the resignation of the incumbent, William Larnach. The winner was Richard Oliver.

Results

References 

 

Dunedin 1878
1878 elections in New Zealand
July 1878 events
Politics of Dunedin
1870s in Dunedin